Teucrium racemosum, also commonly referred to as either the grey germander or forest germander, is a species of flowering plant in the family Lamiaceae. It is endemic to Australia and is found in all mainland states, the Northern Territory and the Australian Capital Territory. It grows in floodplains, dry lake beds and open woodlands. A perennial herb, it has four-sided, densely hairy stems, narrow egg-shaped leaves, and white flowers usually arranged singly in leaf axils. It grows to be between 15 and 40 cm tall.

Description
It is a root suckering plant, meaning that it spreads by pushing up new shoots around the perimeter of its original base. Due to this root suckering ability, it is not uncommon for the Teucrium racemosum to spread to a diameter of several metres. The stems are white or greyish and densely covered with curved hairs pressed against the stem but that are usually lost from the stem's ridges. The edges of the leaves are sometimes somewhat lobed, rolled under or wavy. The pedicel is often horizontal near its far end with the flower held erect. Flowering occurs from September to June.

Taxonomy
Teucrium racemosum was first described in 1810 by Scottish botanist Robert Brown in Prodromus Florae Novae Hollandiae. Teucrium is a genus of the family Lamiaceae. The genus Teucrium was first described by Carl Linnaeus in his work Species Plantarum in 1753. Teucrium has around 300 species, of which 13 are endemic to Australia.

Distribution and habitat
Teucrium racemosum is found in all states and territories of Australia apart from Tasmania. It grows on floodplains, dry lake beds and open woodlands. It is also often found around ephemeral lakes or disturbed areas. also often found around ephemeral lakes or disturbed areas that are usually uninhabitable for most other plants.

Reproduction
As is the case with many Lamiaceae, Teucrium racemosum uses gynodioecy as a method of reproduction. Gynodioecy is a breeding system consisting of male and hermaphroditic plants in a population. Gynodioecy occurs as a consequence of genetic mutation that prevents a hermaphroditic plant from producing pollen, while keeping the female reproductive parts intact. In gynodioecious species, female plants often have much smaller anthers (the part of the stamen where pollen is produced) and as a result produce little to no pollen, whilst in hermaphroditic flowers both male and female sexes are functional. Genetic conflict often arises in these plants, and it is a common observation for female plants to produce more seeds and healthier, higher quality seed than the hermaphroditic plants. This is thought to be because of the extra energy that female plants have access to as a result of not producing pollen. Gynodioecy is an extremely rare form of reproduction, with the Teucrium racemosum being part of just 1% of all plants that exhibit a gynodioecious mating system.  Flowering occurs from September to June.

Conservation
Teucrium racemosum is listed as "not threatened" by the Western Australian Government Department of Parks and Wildlife, and as "least concern" under the Queensland Government Nature Conservation Act 1992 and the Northern Territory Government Territory Parks and Wildlife Conservation Act 1976.

See also
 Glossary of botanical terms
 Glossary of plant morphology
 Glossary of leaf morphology
 Plant morphology
 Plant anatomy
 Teucrium

References

racemosum
Lamiales of Australia
Flora of Queensland
Flora of New South Wales
Flora of the Northern Territory
Flora of South Australia
Flora of Victoria (Australia)
Flora of Western Australia
Taxa named by Robert Brown (botanist, born 1773)
Plants described in 1810